Katatonia is a Swedish heavy metal band formed in Stockholm in 1991 by Jonas Renkse and Anders Nyström. The band started as a studio-only project for the duo, as an outlet for the band's love of death metal. Increasing popularity led them to add more band members for live performances, though outside of the band's founders, the lineup was a constantly changing, revolving door of musicians throughout the 1990s, notably including Mikael Åkerfeldt of the band Opeth for a period. After two death/doom albums, Dance of December Souls (1993) and Brave Murder Day (1996), problems with Renkse's vocal cords coupled with new musical influences led the band away from the screamed vocals of death metal to a more traditional, melodic form of heavy metal music.

The band released two more albums, Discouraged Ones (1998) and Tonight's Decision (1999), before settling into a stable quintet lineup for all of the 2000s. The band released four more albums with said lineup: Last Fair Deal Gone Down (2001), Viva Emptiness (2003), The Great Cold Distance (2006) and Night Is the New Day (2009), with the band slowly moving away from their metal sound while adding more progressive rock sounds to their work over time. While lineup changes started up again into the 2010s, Renkse and Nyström persisted, and the band continued on to release their ninth and tenth studio albums, Dead End Kings (2012) and The Fall of Hearts (2016). After touring in support of the album through 2017, the band entered a hiatus at the beginning of 2018. The band returned from their hiatus in February 2019, with their eleventh studio album, City Burials (2020), and twelfth studio album, Sky Void of Stars (2023).

History

Formation and early years (1991–1997) 
The band was first formed in 1991 by Jonas Renkse and Anders Nyström as a two piece studio-based project. Renkse would provide clean and screamed vocals and drums, while Nyström would provide all bass and guitars. Renkse was the primary lyricist, while Nyström was the primary music composer. The duo had been working together with music in some capacity since 1987, but became serious about making music in 1991, when they began work on their first release, the demo Jhva Elohim Meth... The Revival. The release, along with the next few subsequent releases by the band, were of the death/doom metal sound, with the members being inspired and influenced by the rise of death metal becoming popular in Europe at the time. The release was enough of a hit in the underground metal scene to garner the attention of a small music label, Vic Records, which re-released it as an EP in 1993, which helped gain more exposure for the duo. The newfound popularity found them recruiting a bass guitarist, Guillaume Le Huche, so the trio could play live performances, and returning to the studio to recreate a debut full-length album. The resulting work, Dance of December Souls, was released in late 1993. The album's bleak melancholy and despair of their sound continued to give them the classification of death-doom.

After touring in support of the album, the trio recorded another EP, For Funerals to Come..., which was released in early 1995. However, Le Huche left the band shortly after, and issues finding a replacement found the band break up for a year, while Renkse and Nystrom worked separately on their own projects. Of note, Renkse started up a new band, October Tide, with guitarist Fredrik Norrman. After working some with Norrman on the project, Renkse decided to revive Katatonia with Norrman as the new third member.

After the year off, the band reformed in 1996 to record and release a second studio album, Brave Murder Day. In addition to Fredrik Norrman contributing guitars to the album, the band also recruited Renkse's friend, Mikael Åkerfeldt of the band Opeth, to perform the screamed vocals, as Renkse became unable to do them himself anymore due to medical issues. The release, alongside the EP Sounds of Decay released with the same lineup the next year, were considered their last in the genre of doom/death metal, with the band starting to focus more on clean vocals in subsequent releases. To promote the album, the band recruited Mikael Oretoft to play bass and they embarked on their first European tour with progressive metal band In the Woods...

Move away from death metal (1998–1999) 
While Renkse experimented with clean, melodic vocals over metal instrumentation as early as the 1994 recording of the track "Scarlet Heavens" (later released in very limited capacity on Katatonia/Primordial in 1996), the band did not feel ready to pursue that sort of sound at the time. However, after the band's 1997 releases, due to a desire to create more emotive and evolving music, the band decided to move in that direction. The first of said releases was an EP entitled Saw You Drown, released in early 1997, which also contained the first wide release of "Scarlet Heavens". Later in 1998, the band released their first full-album of this style, titled Discouraged Ones.
After the release, the band signed a multi-album record deal with Peaceville, which would mark the first time the band would work with a bigger label, and stay with them for the long-term. Additionally, Renkse wanted to focus further on dedicating himself to developing his clean vocals, leading him to no longer do any further drumming for the band. The band kept active, recording and releasing their fourth album, Tonight's Decision, in 1999. The sessions were difficult, with the writing alone taking Renkse and Nystrom over seven months to complete. Once recording, they recruited Dan Swanö, who had helped assist the band in the past, as a sessions drummer. While the album contained no screamed vocals, the band still retained Åkerfeldt still assisted with vocal production on the album, as they had with Discouraged Ones.

After the release of Tonight's Decision, the band, tired of continually searching for session musicians, finally decided to put together a concrete, permanent lineup. Fredrick Norrman recruited his brother, Mattias Norrman, as a bassist and Daniel Liljekvist joined the band as the drummer.

Stable lineup and international growth (2000–2009) 
 With the band finally achieving a stable lineup with Renkse, Nystrom, the Norrman brothers and Liljekvist, the band began work on their fifth album, the first of four albums the quintet would release over the course of the next decade. While personnel issues no longer plagued the band, recording sessions were still difficult, this time due to financial constraints, which limited how much time they could spend in the studio. The band worked on recording the album off and on from April to December 2000, and while the stopping and starting proved to be troublesome, it also kept them re-evaluating and reworking their material in the downtime, something they felt ultimately helped the shaping of the album. The resulting album, Last Fair Deal Gone Down was released in May 2001, and marked the band further distancing itself from traditional heavy metal music, in favor of more of a hard rock sound. The band decided to release the Teargas EP shortly prior to the album release, essentially as a single, containing the album track "Teargas" and two B-sides. Another EP of music from the same sessions, Tonight's Music, was also released shortly after the album. The band rounded out the year with a European tour with Åkerfeldt's band Opeth, with Renkse and Nystrom even providing guest vocals at some of the Opeth shows when Åkerfeldt was experiencing trouble with his vocal cords.

By mid-2002, the band had started to write material for their sixth album, and by October 2002, they had entered the studio to begin formal recording sessions. In April 2003, the band released the resulting album, Viva Emptiness. The album was promoted by the release of the single "Ghost of the Sun" and the similarly named Ghost of the Spring tour. The tour, which went through Europe with support act Daylight Dies, went as planned, though the band later had to cancel a June performance in Germany due to sickness, and had July festival appearances cancelled due to issues beyond their control with third party organizers. Still, the album was a success, being their first to chart on any official charts, peaking at no. 17 on the Finnish charts.  

The band continued to spend much of 2003 and 2004 touring in support of the album. The band started writing for their seventh studio album as early as October 2004, and spent six months of 2005 in the studio recording the album, while taking breaks for further touring. The band's only releases during the time period was two compilation album releases: Brave Yester Days, a collection of songs from their death metal era in the mid-1990s, and The Black Sessions, a collection of songs from after they moved away from death metal. While initially planning on releasing the album by the end of 2005, recording sessions went late into 2005, pushing its release into 2006. The album, entitled The Great Cold Distance, released in March 2006, along with the accompanying singles "My Twin" and "Deliberation".

The band again turned to touring, most notably their live performance at Summer Breeze Open Air in 2006 being used for the release of a live album titled Live Consternation in 2007. Additionally, the band's first full North American tour, with Daylight Dies and Moonspell, ran through October and November 2006. The band continued to tour into 2007, focusing on Europe in the first half of the year, and returning to North America, even Mexico, in the latter half of the year.

With focusing on touring in support of The Great Cold Distance for most of 2006 and 2007, the band turned their focus to working on a new album in early 2008. By mid-2008, the band had booked studio time twice, but cancelled both times, not satisfied with the material accumulated to record each time. Writer's block, largely stemming from the band feeling pressure to release a follow up that could measure up to The Great Cold Distance, was main reason for the slow progress, as the album had been their biggest success, critically and financially, at the time. Renkse and Nystrom also had difficulty deciding in what direction the album's sound would move into, eventually deciding to move the band into a more progressive rock sound. Progress continued to be slow, with the band continuing to write into 2009, but not entering the studio until mid-2009. The band continued to tour intermittently as well, including a short tour supporting Porcupine Tree in Europe. After over three and a half years, the band finally released their eighth studio album, in November 2009, under the title Night Is the New Day, including the single "Day and Then the Shade" a month prior. The time spent on the album paid off, with it being generally well received by critics. PopMatters deemed the album the second best metal album of 2009.

Lineup changes, Dead End Kings and The Fall of Hearts (2010–2017) 
Shortly after the release of Night is the New Day, the band's first lineup change in a decade occurred when both Norrman brothers amicably left the band, stating they wanted to focus on life at home rather than further touring cycles abroad. They were replaced by longtime guitar tech Per Eriksson on guitar and Niklas Sandin on bass. In March 2010, the band also released another EP, featuring unreleased and alternate versions of songs from Night is the New Day, titled The Longest Year, which were later included on the special edition reissue of the album in 2011. The band continued to tour extensively, including Sonisphere Festival in the UK, and another North American tour with Swallow the Sun in 2010, and another North American tour with Opeth on their Heritage tour in 2011. The band wrapped up the year with a 20th Anniversary concert in December, with the band playing songs spanning their career, and having past members, including the Norrman brothers and Le Huche, rejoin the band to play on some songs.

The band entered the studio to begin work on their ninth studio album on 30 January 2012. The resulting album, Dead End Kings was released in August in Europe and North America. In support of the release, the band co-headlined the "Epic Kings Idols Tour" with The Devin Townsend Project, in North America in September, followed by the "Dead Ends of Europe Tour" with Alcest and Junius in November of the same year. A music video for the single "Lethean", directed by Lasse Hoile, was released on 18 February 2013. In September 2013, the band also released Dethroned & Uncrowned, an album which featured more acoustic leaning re-workings of the songs from Dead End Kings. It was jointly funded by the Burning Shed record label and a crowd sourcing effort on PledgeMusic, which accumulated 190% of the target goal. The band embarked on an acoustic tour – "The Unplugged & Reworked Tour"  in support of the album in 2014. Just prior to the touring, the band released another EP of b-sides, Kocytean for Record Store Day 2014.

In 2014, Eriksson and Katatonia "mutually agreed to part ways" due to "a difference in views" and Eriksson's decision to live in Barcelona. Bruce Soord of The Pineapple Thief temporarily filled in Eriksson for the band's May tour, while Tomas Åkvik filled in on guitar afterwards in mid-2014. Longtime drummer Liljekvist also left the band in April 2014, on friendly terms, citing personal and financial reasons. The band released another live album, Sanctitude, on 31 March 2015. In November 2015, the band announced Daniel Moilanen as their new drummer and revealed that they were working on a new album to be released in 2016. The album, The Fall of Hearts was released on 20 May 2016. The album, as well as featuring new drummer Daniel Moilanen, was also the first to feature new guitarist Roger Öjersson; who replaced Eriksson's position as second guitarist. Two singles were released in promotion of the album, "Old Heart Falls" and "Serein". The band continued touring in support of the album in 2017, including a North American tour that started in March.

City Burials and Sky Void of Stars (2018–present) 
The band announced they would enter a hiatus in 2018. The band cited Öjersson being hospitalized by a serious back injury at the end of 2017, and a number of other undisclosed issues, for the band needing to take some time off and "re-evaluate what the future holds for the band." In February 2019, the band announced their return to celebrate the tenth anniversary of their 2009 album Night Is the New Day, with an anniversary tour and deluxe release of the album. Their eleventh studio album, City Burials, was released in April 2020; its first single was "Lacquer". Unable to tour in support the album due to the oncoming of the COVID-19 pandemic, the band instead turned to releasing further music. This included releasing a new live album Dead Air (2020), a compilation album Mnemosynean (2021) and a  box set of the band's earliest material Melancholium (2022). and forging ahead into writing and recording a twelfth studio album.

The band released their twelfth studio album, Sky Void of Stars, on January 20, 2023, followed by a European and US tour.

Musical style and influences 
The band is known for changing its sound over the course of its three-decade career. Nystrom summarized it in a 2006 interview:
Yeah sure, we see ourselves as a metal band, but without boundaries and limitations to our sound. We do not necessarily belong to a certain subgenre within metal. We're just playing dark and heavy music and keeping an open mind to evolve and being true to ourselves. I'm proud to say that I believe KATATONIA sounds like no other band. We have eloquently avoided the gothic metal genre most bands tend to fall in when changing their sound from doom/death metal to something more rocking and melodic. We're leaning towards more of a contemporary alternative sound, free of all cheese and clichés.

Similarly, Nystrom noted of the band's live performances: Well, it must be hard sometimes for Jonas to sing his heart out with lyrics referring to personal dark and depressive matters and at the same time also be accused of being a reluctant frontman. I actually think much of the stuff he sings about doesn't go in hand with running around on stage, throwing horns, smiling and firing up the audience. We're not an energetic power metal band. I think the withdrawn and shy aura actually does more justice to the concept of our songs than going wild, but we have some songs mainly on the two last albums that don't really fall into the doom and gloom category, but are still dark. And there the more aggressive approach fits better.

Renkse stated that early inspirations for Katatonia included bands of the death metal variety, namely Morbid Angel, Entombed, Carnage, Autopsy and Paradise Lost; especially the latter's album Gothic. Moreover, Renkse has on multiple occasions cited the work of American progressive metal band Tool as an influence. Nystrom has cited the work of Porcupine Tree as a large influence for the band in their post-death metal eras. For the 2011 Katatonia documentary Last Fair Day Gone Night, Nyström also credited alternative metal bands such as A Perfect Circle and Mudvayne with inspiring the heavy, single-string riff-oriented sound introduced on 2003's Viva Emptiness.

Their early sound has been described as death-doom and death metal, and later they incorporated other styles, such as progressive rock, progressive metal, doom metal, gothic rock and gothic metal.

Comments from other musicians 
Some artists and bands have cited Katatonia as an influence, among which are Agalloch, Nachtmystium, Andy Schmidt of Disillusion, Niklas Kvarforth of Shining, Klimt 1918, Marcela Bovio of Stream of Passion, Daylight Dies, Nucleus Torn, Khors, Marjana Semkina of iamthemorning, Wet, Vladimir Agafonkin of Obiymy Doshchu, Nahemah, Forest Stream, Forgotten Tomb, Alex Vynogradoff of Kauan, Bilocate, Maxime Côté of Catuvolcus, Nocturnal Depression, Last Leaf Down, Schizoid Lloyd, and Pallbearer.

In addition, other artists have been quoted expressing admiration for their work including Mark Jansen of Epica, Luc Lemay of Gorguts, Jim Matheos of Fates Warning, Esa Holopainen of Amorphis, and Bruce Soord of The Pineapple Thief.

Band members 
 Current
 Jonas Renkse – drums (1991–1999), lead vocals (1991–1994, 1997–present), guitars (2009–present)
 Anders Nyström – bass (1991, 1996), guitars, backing vocals (1991–1994, 1997–present), keyboards (1999–present)
 Niklas Sandin – bass (2009–present)
 Daniel Moilanen – drums (2015–present)
 Roger Öjersson – guitars (2016–present)

 Former
 Guillaume Le Huche – bass (1992–1994)
 Mikael Åkerfeldt – unclean vocals (1996)
 Fredrik Norrman – guitars (1996–2009), bass (1998–1999)
 Mikael Oretoft – bass (1997–1998)
 Mattias Norrman – bass (1999–2009)
 Daniel Liljekvist – drums (1999–2014)
 Per Eriksson  – guitars (2009–2014)

Timeline

Discography 

 Dance of December Souls (1993)
 Brave Murder Day (1996)
 Discouraged Ones (1998)
 Tonight's Decision (1999)
 Last Fair Deal Gone Down (2001)
 Viva Emptiness (2003)
 The Great Cold Distance (2006)
 Night Is the New Day (2009)
 Dead End Kings (2012)
 The Fall of Hearts (2016)
 City Burials (2020)
 Sky Void of Stars (2023)

References

External links 
 Official website

Swedish death metal musical groups
Swedish doom metal musical groups
Swedish progressive metal musical groups
Musical groups established in 1991
Musical groups disestablished in 1994
Musical groups reestablished in 1996
Musical groups from Stockholm
Articles which contain graphical timelines
1991 establishments in Sweden
Musical quintets
Swedish gothic rock groups
Swedish gothic metal musical groups